Bandhan Kuchchey Dhaagon Ka is a 1983 Indian Bollywood film directed by Anil Sharma. It stars Shashi Kapoor, Zeenat Aman and Raakhee in pivotal roles.

Plot 
Prem Kapoor is a businessman who lives in a small town with his wife, Bhavna, who is a Judge, and two children, Sunil and Babli. One Sunday, he gets a visitor by the name of Prakash Dutt, who has brought a letter from a woman named Sneh who lives in Bombay, has known Prem for the last seven years, and wants to urgently meet with him. Prem departs for Bombay, meets with Sneh and finds out that he is the father of a seven-year-old boy, Bittu, who is Sneh's son, as a result of intimacy shared between them over seven years ago. Sneh has been diagnosed with cancer and is not expected to live long, she wants Bittu to be taken care of, and Prem agrees to do so. He takes Bittu home with him, while Sneh goes to America for treatment. It is here that Prem will be confronted by Bhavna on one hand, his children on the other, and a blackmailer who wants a huge sum of money to keep the truth about Sneh and Prem's affair from Bhavna and the children.

Cast 
 Shashi Kapoor as Prem Kapoor
 Zeenat Aman as Sneh
 Raakhee as Bhavna
 Deven Verma as Ratanpal Singh
 Bindu as Dr. Shobha
 Prem Chopra as Prakash Dutt
 Master Ravi as Sunil P. Kapoor
 Shubha Khote as Mrs. Malkan
 Raza Murad as Advocate
 Rajendra Nath as Wedding Guest
 Rehana Sultan as Advocate Thakur
 Yunus Parvez as Mrs. Malkan's Lawyer
 Sonia Sahni as Sneh's Nurse
 Jankidas as Sneh's servant
 Master Bittoo as Bittu P. Kapoor

Soundtrack 

 Yeh Bandhan Kachche Dhago Ka (Male) - Kishore Kumar
 Yeh Bandhan Kachche Dhago Ka (Duet) - Lata Mangeshkar, Kishore Kumar
 Yeh Bandhan Kachche Dhagon Ka (sad) - Kishore Kumar
 Yeh Bandhan Kachche Dhagon ka (Sad) version II - Lata Mangeshkar
 Hands Up Jaani Hands Up- Usha Uthup, Suresh Wadkar, Asha Bhosle
Piya Tohe Laaj Nahi Aave - Kishore Kumar, Asha Bhosle

References 

1983 films
1980s Hindi-language films
Films scored by Hemant Bhosle
Films directed by Anil Sharma